Hypodoxa emiliaria is a moth of the family Geometridae first described by Achille Guenée in 1858. It is found in Australia, New Guinea and on the Solomon Islands.

Subspecies
Hypodoxa emiliaria emiliaria
Hypodoxa emiliaria aignanensis Prout, 1916 (Louisiade Archipelago)
Hypodoxa emiliaria basinigra (Warren, 1902) (Papua New Guinea)
Hypodoxa emiliaria fulgurea Prout, 1913 (Irian Jaya)
Hypodoxa emiliaria purpurifera (Warren, 1899) (Solomon Islands)
Hypodoxa emiliaria purpurissata (Lucas, 1901) (Australia: Queensland)
Hypodoxa emiliaria subleprosa Prout, 1917 (Louisiade Archipelago)

References

Moths described in 1858
Pseudoterpnini